The Zanzottera MZ 100 is an Italian aircraft engine, intended for use in powered paragliders.

The engine was originally designed and produced by Zanzottera Technologies of Italy, but the design was sold, along with the rest of the company's two-stroke ultralight aircraft engine line to Compact Radial Engines of Surrey, British Columbia, Canada. Compact Radial Engines was then in turn acquired by Fiate Aviation Co., Ltd. of Hefei, Anhui, China in August 2017. Fiate Aviation did not advertise the engine as available in 2021.

Design and development
The engine is a single-cylinder two-stroke,  displacement, air-cooled, gasoline engine design, with a poly V belt reduction drive with reduction ratio of 3.64:1. It produces  at 9700 rpm. It can be fitted with a recoil starter or electric start.

Specifications (MZ100)

See also

References

Compact Radial Engines aircraft engines
Zanzottera aircraft engines
Two-stroke aircraft piston engines
Air-cooled aircraft piston engines
2000s aircraft piston engines